The Women's 10 m synchro platform competition of the 2018 European Aquatics Championships was held on 7 August 2018 at the Royal Commonwealth Pool in Edinburgh.

Results
The final was started at 13:30.

References

Women's 10 m synchro platform